Michele Malaspina (16 August 1908 – 13 January 1979) was an Italian actor and voice actor.

Life and career 
Born in Bolzaneto, Genoa, the son of two shopkeepers, since childhood Malaspina has a passion for theater and was an actor in a company of amateur actors. At 18 years old, he entered the stage company of Alfredo Sainati, and from then he was part of the major stage companies of the time, notably the ones held by Emma Gramatica, Ermete Zacconi, Dina Galli, Ruggero Ruggeri and Camillo Pilotto. He made his film debut in the early 1930s, and during his long career he was mainly cast in supporting roles, being often used for playing high society characters. He worked for a long time at EIAR as an actor of radio-plays, and was also active as a dubber.

Selected filmography
 The Knight of San Marco (1939)
 Lucky Night (1941)
 His Young Wife (1945)
 Immigrants (1948)
 Heaven over the Marshes (1949)
 A Dog's Life (1950)
 Last Meeting (1951)
 Destiny (1951)
 The Shameless Sex (1952)
 Who is Without Sin (1952)
 Beauties in Capri (1952)
 Deceit (1952)
 The Dream of Zorro (1952)
 The Adventures of Mandrin (1952)
 Lieutenant Giorgio (1952)
 Sunday Heroes (1952)
 Past Lovers (1953)
 I cinque dell'Adamello (1954)
 Tragic Ballad (1954)
 The Pirate and the Slave Girl (1959) 
 Two Sergeants of General Custer (1965)
 Due mafiosi contro Al Capone (1966)  
 The Assassination of Matteotti (1973)

References

External links 

 

1908 births
1979 deaths
Italian male film actors
Italian male television actors
Italian male stage actors
Italian male voice actors
Actors from Genoa
20th-century Italian male actors